Pipi Raho (born 4 March 1988) is a Papua New Guinean cricketer. He made his One Day International debut for Papua New Guinea on 8 November 2014 against Hong Kong in Australia. He made his Twenty20 International debut on 7 February 2016 against Ireland in Australia.

References

External links
 

1988 births
Living people
Papua New Guinean cricketers
Papua New Guinea One Day International cricketers
Papua New Guinea Twenty20 International cricketers
People from the National Capital District (Papua New Guinea)